Ceratophysella is a genus of springtails and allies in the family Hypogastruridae. There are at least 100 described species in Ceratophysella.

See also
 List of Ceratophysella species

References

Poduromorpha
Springtail genera